Weelde Air Base  is a NATO reserve airfield located in Weelde, a village in the Ravels municipality in Belgium. It is operated by the Belgian Air Component that has no military flight operations at that location, besides aircraft arriving to be stored or leaving storage, for example retired F-16 aircraft. The Belgian Air Component also uses the airfield for the activities of the Belgian Air Cadets.

Weelde Air Base is also publicly accessible as a light general aviation field and home to the gliding club "Kempische Aero Club".

See also 
 List of airports in Belgium

References

External links 
 Airfield overview
 Gliding club

Belgian airbases
Airports in Antwerp Province
Airports established in 1953
Ravels